William de Chambre was an Irish priest in the fourteenth century. He was Archdeacon of Dublin then Lord High Treasurer of Ireland and finally Dean of St Patrick's Cathedral, Dublin.

References

Archdeacons of Dublin
Deans of St. Patrick's Cathedral, Dublin
Lord High Treasurers of Ireland